D'Sa is a surname. Notable people with the surname include:

Ian D'Sa, Canadian guitarist
Leroy D'Sa (born 1953), Indian badminton player and coach
Lisa Barros D'Sa, British film director, writer, and producer
Wilfred D'sa, Indian politician